97.5 Kemet FM  is an urban radio station in Nottingham, England. Founded by Marceline Powell in 2007, its focus is on the music and culture of the city's African and Caribbean communities.

References

External links

Radio stations in Nottinghamshire
Culture in Nottingham